Stordalen may refer to:

People
Stordalen (surname), Norwegian surname

Places
Stordalen, Trøndelag, a village in Meråker municipality in Trøndelag county, Norway
Stordalen Chapel, parish church in Meråker, Trøndelag county, Norway
Stordalen, Vestland, a skiing area in Masfjorden municipality in Vestland county, Norway
Stordalen, Sweden, a mire in Kiruna Municipality in Norrbotten County, Sweden
Stordalen Havn, a harbour in the Torsukattak Fjord in Nanortalik, Greenland

See also
Stordal, a municipality in Møre og Romsdal county, Norway
Stjørdalen, a valley in Trøndelag county, Norway